The Tomina River is a river of Bolivia in the Chuquisaca Department. It is a right affluent of the Río Grande.

See also
List of rivers of Bolivia

References
Rand McNally, The New International Atlas, 1993.

Rivers of Chuquisaca Department